Man on a Bus is a 1955 American film about settlers in Israel.

Plot summary
Six people who have emigrated to Israel catch a bus through the Negev Desert. The bus breaks down.

Cast
Walter Brennan as Saul
Broderick Crawford as Nahum, bus driver
Rosemary DeCamp as Miriam
J. Carrol Naish as Mr. Stein
Ruth Roman as Rachel
Kim Charney as Tobias
Peter Leeds as Enoch

References

External links

Man on a Bus at Israel Film Center
Copy of film at Spielberg Jewish Film Archive

1950s English-language films
1955 films
American drama short films
1950s American films
1955 drama films
American black-and-white films